Khatami is an Iranian surname. Notable people with the surname include:

 Ahmad Khatami, Iranian conservative cleric, one of the scribes of the Iranian Assembly of Experts who has no relationship with the former president, Mohammad Khatami
 Ali Khatami (born 1953), Chief of Staff of President of Iran (2001–2005) and brother of Mohammad and Mohammad Reza Khatami
 Mohammad Khatami (born 1943), Iranian reformist President, former President of Iran (1997–2005)
 Mohammad Amir Khatami (1920–1975), former commander of the Iranian air force
 Mohammad-Reza Khatami (born 1959), Iranian reformist politician, vice speaker of Iranian Parliament (2001–2004) and brother of Mohammad Khatami
 Ruhollah Khatami, father of Mohammad, Mohammad Reza, and Ali Khatami, and former Friday prayer Imam at the city of Yazd